William Whitticker (born August 2, 1982) is a retired American football offensive guard in the National Football League. He was selected in the seventh round of the 2005 NFL Draft by the Green Bay Packers. He played fifteen games in his rookie NFL season and started fourteen of them, recording one fumble recovery but also seven false start penalties. He was released from the Packers before the 2006 NFL season and spent time on the Miami Dolphins and Washington Redskins rosters but did not play in any regular-season games.

External links
Whitticker released by Redskins after injury during training camp

1982 births
Living people
Sportspeople from Evansville, Indiana
American football offensive guards
Michigan State Spartans football players
Players of American football from Indiana
Green Bay Packers players